Felicidad may refer to:

 Felicidad (film) or Happiness, a 1957 Mexican film
 Felicidad Ogumoro (born 1949), Northern Mariana Islands politician

Music
Felicidad (album), Spanish-language version of Felicità, by Al Bano and Romina Power, 1982
"Felicidad" (ABBA song), Spanish-language version of "Happy New Year", 1980
"Felicidad" (Gloria Estefan song), 1996
 "Felicidad (Margherita)", a song by Boney M, 1980
 "La felicidad", a song by Palito Ortega, 1966
 "Felicidad", a song by BZN, 1978
 "Felicidad", a song by Sally Field, 1966

See also
Felicidade, a 1991–1992 Brazilian telenovela
Felicidade, a Brazilian film of 1930
Felicidades (disambiguation)